The Party for Democracy and Progress was a political party in Burkina Faso (former Upper Volta). 

It was founded in April 1994 after a split in the National Convention of Progressive Patriots–Social Democratic Party in May 1993.

It merged in February 1996 with the Union of the Democratic Left and the Party of Social Progress.

After merger with the Burkinabè Socialist Party the PDP became the Party for Democracy and Progress / Socialist Party.

At the legislative elections in 1997 the party won 10.1% of the popular vote and 6 out of 111 seats.

Defunct political parties in Burkina Faso
Social democratic parties
Socialist International
Political parties established in 1994
1994 establishments in Burkina Faso
Political parties disestablished in 1996
1996 disestablishments in Burkina Faso